Pets Corner UK Ltd is a United Kingdom-based ethical pet care retail store chain. Its main area of business is selling specialist natural pet foods, accessories and treatments predominantly for dogs and cats, but also for small animals, reptiles, birds, wildlife, and tropical and cold water fish.

The company's headquarters is in Crawley, West Sussex, United Kingdom. It has 142 stores across the UK. Established in 1968, the organisation has continued to grow, and in April 2016 it acquired competitor retailer PamPurredPets adding an additional 51 stores to its existing portfolio, making it the second largest pet retailer in the UK by store numbers and EBITDA. In February 2018, the company reported strong growth[1], with 98% of sales attributed to its network of stores rather than through e-commerce.

To date, the 142 Pets Corner stores consist of 84 standalone stores and 58 garden centre concessions.

History 

Pets Corner began in 1968 when Mark and Sandra Richmond, (parents of the present Managing Director Dean Richmond), bought a small shop in Haywards Heath, Sussex. Both had worked in farming and had owned many pets.

The shop grew very quickly and was relocated to larger premises in South Road where it traded until 2011, before it moved to its current, much bigger store on Wivelsfield Road, Haywards Heath. In 1983, a second store was opened in George Street, Hove, and this too enjoyed rapid growth.

In 1992 a new garden centre concept store was opened in Brighton and during this time many of the company’s current sales techniques were developed.

In 1998, Dean Richmond bought the business (which at the time comprised seven shops) from his parents.

In 1999, with the agreement of Country Gardens’ CEO Nicholas Marshall, Pets Corner began opening a series of further garden centre concessions. In 2000, Country Gardens was bought by Wyevale and the expansion of Pets Corner garden centre concessions was temporarily halted. However, in 2008 when Nicholas Marshall became CEO of Wyevale, expansion of Pets Corner concessions into Wyevale garden centres quickly resumed.  As a result, between 2000 and 2008, 21 stores opened and three independent pet shops were acquired. The first standalone store was opened in West Hove in 2007, and in 2009 the Bournemouth standalone store was acquired and part let to The Pet Practice Veterinary Surgery.

In 2004, the first warehouse was opened in a former chicken shed measuring 2,000 sq ft.[2]

Headquarters and distribution 
In 2017, the Pets Corner headquarters was relocated to the Spindle Way site in Crawley, West Sussex. This 5,974 sq ft. HQ houses key departments such as accounts, training, HR and buyers, alongside a new store and Doodley Dogs day care centre.

Pets Corner opened a brand new warehouse based in Handcross, West Sussex in early 2020 which follows their Green ethos. They use renewable energy from Solar Panels for the lighting/heating, electric charging points and proudly give zero to landfill.

Services 
The organisation continues to expand its offering to customers and add complementary services, and in 2017 incorporated veterinary group Pets Practice, and launched the first of its Natural Pet Grooming ‘Dogwood’ Spas, providing treatment packages and natural products for dogs. Dogwood is run by Julie Finlay, Head of Grooming who holds a City & Guilds Level 3 Diploma in Professional Dog Styling.

In 2017, Pets Corner established the online comparison site petfoodexpert.co.uk, where popular pet food products are scored on nutritional quality. The site also provides a platform from which manufacturers can share information on the quality of the ingredients, digestibility and allergen levels.

Supplying livestock 
Pets Corner stocks a selection of small animals, reptiles, fish and aquatic species that have been chosen for their suitability as home pets. Each animal is supplied with a 21-Day Health and (for small animals) Sex Guarantee.

In the media 
Pets Corner has featured in a number of radio and television programmes, notably Channel 4’s Undercover Boss UK in 2014[6] and BBC Radio 4’s The Bottom Line, Pets Mean Pounds[7].

References 

 Strong year sets Pets Corner up for      growth, Insider Media Ltd, 22 January 2018, https://www.insidermedia.com/insider/southeast/strong-year-sets-pets-corner-up-for-growth
 Jump up^ "vART helps Pets Corner hit      latest milestone" (PDF). Advanced Retail Technologies. Retrieved 4      December 2012
 Jump up^ "LED Eco Lights wins exclusive      nationwide contract with Pets Corner". The Green Organisation. Retrieved 4      December 2012
 Jump up^ "LED Eco Lights win exclusive      Pets Corner contract". Pet Product Marketing. Retrieved 4 December 2012
 Jump up^ "Pets Corner profits up as it      plots expansion". RetailWeek. Retrieved 4 December 2012
 Channel 4, Undercover Boss, http://www.channel4.com/programmes/undercover-boss, 2014
 BBC Radio 4, The Bottom Line, http://www.bbc.co.uk/programmes/b09d4321

Pet stores
Companies based in West Sussex
Pets in the United Kingdom
Veterinary companies of the United Kingdom
1968 establishments in England
Retail companies established in 1968